Christa Wiese (born 25 December 1967) is a German former track and field athlete who competed for East Germany in the shot put.

Born in Templin, Bezirk Neubrandenburg, she became a member of the SC Neubrandenburg sports club. She had the peak of her career in 1989 at the age of twenty-two. At the East German Indoor Athletics Championships she finished runner-up to Heike Hartwig by a margin of one centimetre. This performance gained her selection for the 1989 IAAF World Indoor Championships. This was her first and only major senior medal.

In the outdoor 1989 season she cleared twenty metres exactly at a meet in Schwerin – a mark which placed her in the top ten outdoors that year. She placed third nationally in the shot put both indoors and outdoors that year, which was her last at a high level.

References

External links

1967 births
Living people
People from Templin
People from Bezirk Neubrandenburg
German female shot putters
East German female shot putters
Sportspeople from Brandenburg
World Athletics Indoor Championships medalists